A leadership election for the Civic Democratic Party (ODS)  was held on 21 April 1991. Václav Klaus was elected the first leader of ODS. 247 delegates were allowed to vote. Klaus was the only candidate. He received 220 votes while 19 delegates voted against him.

Results

References

1991 April
1991 elections in Czechoslovakia
1991 04 Civic Democratic Party
Civic Democratic Party leadership election